Book of Enoch is any of several works that attribute themselves to the biblical figure Enoch:

 1 Enoch, commonly just the Book of Enoch, dates to 300 BC and survives only in Ge'ez.
 2 Enoch dates to the 1st century AD and survives only in Old Church Slavonic.
 3 Enoch dates to the 5th century AD and survives in Hebrew.
 Liber Logaeth (1583), also known as the "Book of Enoch" to John Dee.

See also 
 Enoch (disambiguation)